Kurnool is a city in the state of Andhra Pradesh, India. It formerly served as the capital of Andhra State (1953–1956). The city is often referred to as "The Gateway of Rayalaseema". Kurnool is also known as The City of Gem Stones. It also serves as the district headquarters of its Kurnool district.  census, it is the fifth most populous city in the state with a population of 484,327. It is located on the banks of the Tungabhadra river. Although the area has been inhabited for thousands of years, modern Kurnool was founded in the 16th century CE with the construction of the Konda Reddy Fort.

Etymology 
The original name of Kurnool is found in historical records as Kandanavōlu or Kandanōlu. It used to be a crossing on the Tungabhadra River, where the bullock cart caravans are believed to have greased their wheels ("kandana" being a reference to grease). The city is often referred to as "The Gateway of Rayalaseema".

History

Palaeolithic era 
The Ketavaram rock paintings from the Paleolithic era and are (18 kilometres from Kurnool).
Also the Jurreru Valley, Katavani Kunta and Yaganti in Kurnool District have some important rock art and paintings in the vicinity, may be dated from 35,000 to 40,000 years ago.

Belum Caves are geologically and historically important caves in the district.  There are indications that Jain and Buddhist monks were occupying these caves centuries ago. Many Buddhists relics were found inside the caves.  These relics are now housed in Museum at Ananthapur. Archaeological survey of India (ASI) found remnants of vessels and other artifacts of pre-Buddhist era and has dated the remnants of vessels found in the caves to 4500 BC.

Vijayanagara era 
Little was known about Kurnool town before the 11th century. The earliest knowledge of this settlement dates from the 11th century. It has developed as transit place on the southern banks of the river Tungabhadra.

Ruled by the Cholas in 12th Century and later taken over by the Kakatiya dynasty in 13th century. Kurnool developed into a transit point on the southern banks of the Tungabhadra River. It eventually fell under the rule of a jaghirdar before becoming a part of the Vijayanagar dynasty. King Achyuta Raya, successor of Sri Krishnadeva Raya constructed the Kurnool Fort during the 16th century.

Mughals Rule 
The Abyssinian, Abdul Wahab Khan, defeated King Gopal Raja of the Vijayanagar Kingdom in the 17th century and went on to rule the land for 16 years until his death.

In 1686, Kurnool fell under the influence of the Mughals who were ruled by Emperor Aurangzeb. Later on in Kurnool's history, it was ruled by the Nawabs until the British Government took over in 1839.

Nawabs

Ghulam Rasul Khan Bahadur (died on 12 July 1840) was the last Nawab of Kurnool, Andhra Pradesh. He ruled from 1823 to 1839 until the kingdom was defeated by the East India Company. On 12 October 1839, a war broke out between British Indian Army and the kingdom and continued for six days until the king was detained on 18 October. He was subsequently sent to Tiruchirappalli Central Prison where he died on 12 July 1840.

Post independence 
Kurnool was the capital of erstwhile Andhra State between 1 October 1953 and 31 October 1956. The state was later merged with Telugu speaking districts of Hyderabad State to form Andhra Pradesh with Hyderabad as the state's capital on 1 November 1956. Presently Kurnool is in the divided Andhra Pradesh state.

Geography 
It has an average elevation of 273 metres (898 feet). Kurnool lies on the banks of the Tungabhadra River. The Hundri and Neeva rivers also flow through the city. The K.C.Canal (Kurnool–Cuddapah) was built by the Dutch for transportation, but later used for irrigation.

Cityscape 

Landmarks in and around the city include Konda Reddy Fort Formerly called Kondareddy Burj is the Historical Monuement and Major Tourist Attraction of Kurnool located at the north east part of the city. Orvakal rock Garderns is the Sculpture Garden with Ancient cave lies on the South East of the city.

Climate 

Demographics 
As per final data of 2011 census, Kurnool urban agglomeration had a population of 484,327, making it the fifth largest city in the state of Andhra Pradesh. The literacy rate of Kurnool was 77.37 per cent at the time of the 2011 census.

Religion

As per final data of 2011 census, Hindus formed the majority in the Kurnool urban agglomeration. Other religious groups found in Kurnool are Muslims, Christians, and Jains.

Language

Telugu (67.91%) is the official and most spoken language. Urdu (28.17%) and Hindi (1.02%) are also spoken.

Government and politics
Kurnool serves as the district headquarters of its Kurnool district. The city is administered by Kurnool Municipal Corporation.

Education 
The primary and secondary school education is imparted by Government, aided and private schools of the School Education Department of the state.
Notable institutions located in the city include:

Kurnool Medical College
Osmania College
Rayalaseema University
Indian Institute of Information Technology Design and Manufacturing Kurnool
Silver Jubilee Government College

Transport

Roadways 
National Highway 44 (India) which runs from Srinagar to Kanyakumari and also highway of Bangalore to Hyderabad. passes through Kurnool.

National highway 340C [ Kurnool-Dornala ] which connects to Srisailam, Vinukonda, Guntur, Vijayawada.

National Highway 40, [ Rayalaseema Expressway ] which runs from Kurnool to Chittoor, are the major highways passing through the city.

The city has a total road length of 519.22 km State owned bus transport system, APSRTC, operates buses from Kurnool bus station to other parts of the state.

Railways 
Kurnool City railway station lies on the Bengaluru – Hyderabad railway line. It is classified as an A–category station in the Hyderabad railway division of South Central Railway zone. Another railway station name Kotla lies in the middle of the city.

Airport
Commercial operations of the greenfield airport were started in March 2021.

Economy 
Kurnool is endowed with good mineral resources. The important minerals are Iron ore, dolomite, limestone, ochre, quartz and silica.

Notable people 

 

Abdul Hafeez Khan, MLA Kurnool, YSRCP
K. E. Krishnamurthy, former Deputy Chief Minister, Andhra Pradesh
Arcot Ramasamy Mudaliar - Founder of Justice party, Diwan of Mysore and the First President of UNESCO 
Kotla Jayasurya Prakasha Reddy, former member of parliament and Union minister, Railways
Kotla Vijaya Bhaskara Reddy, former Chief Minister, United Andhra Pradesh
Damodaram Sanjivayya, former Chief Minister, United Andhra Pradesh
Machani Somappa, industrialist and recipient of Padma sri honour
T. G. Venkatesh, Indian businessman and politician

See also 
 List of cities in Andhra Pradesh by population
 List of Urban Agglomerations in Andhra Pradesh
 List of municipal corporations in Andhra Pradesh

References

External links 

 
 Kurnool district Mandal Information

 
Cities in Andhra Pradesh
Muslim princely states of India
Princely states of Andhra Pradesh
Former capital cities in India
District headquarters of Andhra Pradesh